Solidago brachyphylla is a North American species of flowering plant in the family Asteraceae known by the common name Dixie goldenrod. It is native to the southeastern United States, from southern Mississippi to the Carolinas.

Solidago brachyphylla is a perennial herb up to 120 cm (4 feet) tall, with a thick underground rhizome. One plant can produce as many as 200 small yellow flower heads in a branched array at the top of the plant.

References

External links
photo of herbarium specimen at Missouri Botanical Garden, collected in Alabama in 1897, isotype of Solidago brachyphylla
Alabama Plant Atlas
Atlas of Florida Vascular Plants

brachyphylla
Flora of the Southeastern United States
Plants described in 1842